The 2021 Sydney to Hobart Yacht Race was the 76th annual running of the Sydney to Hobart Yacht Race, hosted by Cruising Yacht Club of Australia and sponsored by Rolex. It began on Sydney Harbour at 13:00 on 26 December 2021, before heading south for  via the Tasman Sea, Bass Strait, Storm Bay and up the River Derwent, to cross the finish line in Hobart, Tasmania.

Following the cancelled 2020 race, 112 entries were submitted for the 2021 edition. By 25 December, the starting lineup was down to 91 and only 88 left the harbour to start the race. The mass withdrawal was due to crew members testing positive for COVID-19 or deciding not to compete to avoid catching the virus. 5 boats withdrew in the 24 hours before the race started. For the first time, entries were accepted for a two-handed division (sailed by a crew of 2 people) but, due to the use of autopilot, they were ineligible for the overall handicap prize. Within the first two days, 36 boats retired due to injuries or damage caused by strong weather. 50 completed the race.

Results

Line honours (first 10)

Handicap results (Top 10)

References

December 2021 sports events in Australia
Sydney to Hobart Yacht Race
Sydney
Sydney